Crkvino is a village in the municipality of Veles, North Macedonia.

Demographics
Toward the end of the 19th and beginning of the 20th centuries, Crkvino traditionally was a mixed Orthodox Macedonian, Macedonian Muslim (Torbeš) and Muslim Turkish village. On the 1927 ethnic map of Leonhard Schulze-Jena, the village is written as "Črkvina" and shown as a mixed Muslim Bulgarian and Christian Bulgarian village. Some of the Macedonian Muslim population left the village after the Second World War. Muslim Albanians settled in Crkvino after the Turkish population also migrated from the village. In the 1960s there were 9 Muslim Albanian households in the village.

As of the 2021 census, Crkvino had 353 residents with the following ethnic composition:
Bosniaks 292
Persons for whom data are taken from administrative sources 32
Macedonians 12
Albanians 11
Turks 3
Others 3

According to the 2002 census, the village had a total of 363 inhabitants. Ethnic groups in the village include:
Bosniaks 336
Albanians 25
Macedonians 2

References

External links

Villages in Veles Municipality
Macedonian Muslim villages
Albanian communities in North Macedonia
Turkish communities in North Macedonia